Ranpirnase is a ribonuclease enzyme found in the oocytes of the Northern Leopard Frog (Rana pipiens). Ranpirnase is a member of the pancreatic ribonuclease (RNase A) protein superfamily and degrades RNA substrates with a sequence preference for uracil and guanine nucleotides. Along with amphinase, another leopard frog ribonuclease, Ranpirnase has been studied as a potential cancer and antiviral treatment due to its unusual mechanism of cytotoxicity tested against transformed cells and antiviral activity.

Ranpirnase was originally discovered by scientists at TamirBio, a biotechnology company (formerly Alfacell Corporation), where it was tested in preclinical assays and in clinical trials under the name Pannon or Onconase, and TMR004. The mechanism of action of ranpirnase has been attributed to the RNA interference pathway, potentially through cleaving siRNA molecules; to cleavage of transfer RNA; and to interference with the NF-κB pathway. Currently (as of March 2020) Ranpirnase is in clinical trials as a potential antiviral.

References 

Ribonucleases
Experimental drugs